Bijou is a French word meaning jewel, often loosely applied to buildings to mean small and elegant. It may also refer to:

Buildings
 Bijou Palace, also known as the Al-Gawhara Palace, a palace in Cairo, Egypt
 Bijou Theatre (Manhattan), two former Broadway theaters in New York City
 Bijou Theatre (Boston), Massachusetts
 Bijou Theatre (Knoxville, Tennessee)
 Bijou Theatre, Melbourne, Australia
 Bijou Theatre Building, Marinette, Wisconsin
 Bijou Theater (Chicago), Illinois
 Royal Bijou Theatre, a former theatre in Paignton, Devon, England

Arts, entertainment, and media

Fictional characters
 Bijou, a character in the South Korean manhwa series Ragnarok
Andréia Bijou, a character in the Brazilian telenovela Duas Caras 
Bijou, a character in the American war film Passage to Marseille
 Bijou, a hamster in the Japanese anime series Hamtaro
 Bijou, a fish in the American television series FishCenter Live

Film and television
 Bijou (film), a 1972 American film directed by Wakefield Poole
 Matinee at the Bijou, an American television series on PBS

Music
Bijou is the title of the fourth track on the 1960 album The Hottest New Group in Jazz by Lambert, Hendricks & Ross
 Bijou (album), a 1975 live album by jazz saxophonist Archie Shepp
 "Bijou" (Queen song), song by Queen from the 1991 album Innuendo

Other uses in arts, entertainment, and media
Le Bijou de la reine, an 1855 play written by Alexandre Dumas fils
The Basque and Bijou, one of the 15 short stories in Anaïs Nin's book Delta of Venus
 Bijou Funnies, an underground comic edited by Jay Lynch
Bijou d'Inde (1993–2010), British Thoroughbred racehorse and sire

People
Bijou Heron (1863–1937), American stage actress
Bijou Fernandez (1877–1961), American stage and silent film actress
 Bijou Phillips (born 1980), American actress, model, and singer
 Sidney W. Bijou (1908–2009), American child psychologist
Jude Bijou (born 1946), American licensed psychotherapist, lecturer, and multi-award winning author 
 Bijou (footballer) (born 1986), Cape Verdean former footballer
 Bijou Thaangjam, Indian actor, lyricist, art director, chef, and entrepreneur

Places
 Bijou, California, a town in South Lake Tahoe
 Bijou Geyser, in the Upper Geyser Basin of Yellowstone
 Bijou Hills, South Dakota, a census-designated place
 Bijou Park, California, a town in South Lake Tahoe
 A main downtown artery in Colorado Springs, Colorado

Other uses
 Bijou (cocktail), a gin-based cocktail
 Bijou (jewellery), small pieces of valuable or costume jewellery
 Citroën Bijou, a coupé car manufactured by Citroën 
 Bijou bottle, a small vial used in laboratories

See also
 Bijoux (disambiguation)